Tymchuk is a Ukrainian surname. It derives from the Christian name Timothy, and its Ukrainian derivatives, Tymko. The surname, Tymchuk, was created by adding the Ukrainian patronymic suffix, -uk,  meaning someone of Tymko, usually the son of Tymko. It may refer to the following individuals:

 Dmytro Tymchuk (1972–2019), Ukrainian military expert and blogger
 Yakiv Tymchuk (1919–1988), Ukrainian Greek Catholic clandestine bishop

Related surnames
 Tymoshenko
 Tymoschuk

Surnames of Ukrainian origin
Ukrainian-language surnames
Patronymic surnames